Belize Telemedia Limited (BTL), formerly Belize Telecommunications Limited, is a telecommunications company in Belize. Established in 1972 as the Telecommunications Authority, it rapidly became Belize's leading telecommunication provider in the 1980s and 1990s.  In May 2007, it changed its name from Belize Telecommunications Limited to Belize Telemedia Limited. The wireless division of BTL is called DigiCell. In August 2009, the company was nationalized by the Government of Belize, who appropriated 94% of its shares which were previously controlled by Michael Ashcroft.

References

External links
  Belize Telemedia Limited Official site
 DigiCell mobile service Official site
The Reporter, 29 September 2006 "Outrage at callous BTL! Call for Fonseca to resign "
 The Reporter, 8 September 2006 "BTL’s $5.8M tax write-off: Another can of worms for Musa"

Telecommunications companies of Belize
Telecommunications companies established in 1972
1972 establishments in British Honduras
1987 mergers and acquisitions